James Franklin Bell (January 9, 1856 – January 8, 1919) was an officer in the United States Army who served as Chief of Staff of the United States Army from 1906 to 1910.

Bell was a major general in the Regular United States Army, commanding the Department of the East, with headquarters at Governors Island, New York at the time of his death in 1919. He entered West Point in 1874, and graduated 38th in a class of 43 in 1878, with a commission as second lieutenant of the 9th Cavalry Regiment, a black unit.

Bell became notorious for his actions in the Philippine–American War, in which he ordered the detainment of Filipino civilians in concentration camps.

Early life and education
Bell was born to John Wilson and Sarah Margaret Venable (Allen) Bell in Shelbyville, Kentucky. His mother died when he was young. During the American Civil War, Bell's family, living in a border state, stood strongly in favor of the Confederacy.

In 1874, after two years of working in a general store, Bell sought a military career, and secured appointment to West Point, where he eventually graduated 38th in a class of 43. The War Department assigned him to the 9th Cavalry, one of the black units formed after the Civil War. Then in Kentucky on home leave, Bell attempted to resign his commission. This, in fact, was illegal, but someone at the War Department understood the attitudes that were behind this action and assigned him to the all-white 7th Cavalry. He joined the unit at Fort Abraham Lincoln, Dakota Territory, on October 1, 1878.

Indian Wars
Bell became an instructor of military science and tactics and taught mathematics at Southern Illinois University, a position held from 1886 until 1889. While in Illinois, he read law and passed the Illinois bar. In 1889, he returned to the 7th Cavalry. Although the regiment participated in the Wounded Knee Massacre in South Dakota, Bell was on personal leave and did not participate. He was promoted to first lieutenant on December 29, 1890, and participated in the Pine Ridge, South Dakota campaign in 1891. Later that year, the 7th Cavalry was posted to Fort Riley, Kansas, and Bell joined the staff of the Cavalry and Light Artillery School. He soon became adjutant, then secretary of the school. In November 1894, Bell became aide-de-camp to General James W. Forsyth and posted to the Department of California. He was transferred to Fort Apache, Arizona Territory, in July 1897 and then to Vancouver Barracks, Washington, in February 1898.

Philippines
At the outbreak of the Spanish–American War, Bell was acting as adjutant to General Forsyth, then commanding the Department of the West, with headquarters at San Francisco. He was immediately commissioned colonel of volunteers, and authorized to organize a regiment. This regiment was ordered to the Philippines and, under his command, saw service in the Philippine–American War.

After a few months in the Philippines, Bell was promoted from his commission of captain in the Regular Army to brigadier general in the Regular Army, outranking many officers previously his senior.

Bell was awarded the Medal of Honor for his actions of September 9, 1899 near Porac on Luzon Island in the Philippines. According to the official citation, "while in advance of his regiment [Bell] charged 7 insurgents with his pistol and compelled the surrender of the captain and 2 privates under a close fire from the remaining insurgents concealed in a bamboo thicket."

Concentration camp policy 
In late 1901, Bell took command of American operations in Batangas and Laguna provinces. In response to General Miguel Malvar's guerrilla warfare tactics, Bell employed counterinsurgency tactics (described by some as a scorched earth campaign) that took a heavy toll on guerrilla fighters and civilians alike. "Zones of protection" were established, and civilians were given identification papers and forced into concentration camps (called reconcentrados) which were surrounded by free-fire zones. At the Lodge Committee, in an attempt to counter the negative reception in America to General Bell's camps, Colonel Arthur Wagner, the US Army's chief public relations office, insisted the camps were to "protect friendly natives from the insurgents, and assure them an adequate food supply" while teaching them "proper sanitary standards". Wagner's assertion was undermined by a letter from a commander of one of the camps, who described them as "suburbs of Hell". Between January and April 1902, 8,350 people died in the camps out of a population of 298,000. Some camps experienced mortality rates as high as 20 percent.

According to a legal brief written for the United States Senate Committee on the Philippines in 1902 by Julian Codman and Moorfield Storey of the American Anti-Imperialist League, Bell said in an interview with The New York Times on May 3, 1901, that one-sixth of the population of Luzon had been killed or died of dengue fever in the previous two years of war. This would be 616,000 deaths according to Codman and Storey. However according to Gore Vidal in a 1981 article for The New York Review, his researchers found no reference to Bell in The New York Times on that date. Luzon's population rose from 3,666,822 in 1901 to 3,798,507 in the 1903 census.

Most modern estimates place the total number of Filipino casualties during the Philippine–American War to be roughly 200,000, the majority of which are attributed to a cholera epidemic near the end of the war.

Service in America
In July 1903, Bell was transferred to Fort Leavenworth, Kansas, where he headed the Command and General Staff School until April 14, 1906; Bell was promoted major general, and was appointed Chief of the Army General Staff. He served for four years, under Presidents Theodore Roosevelt and William Howard Taft. Bell was the first chief officer of the United States Army in 45 years who had not served in the American Civil War.

When the United States military forces of the Western Pacific concentrated in the Philippines, he returned to Manila in 1911, as military commander, until war with Mexico seemed imminent. He was then ordered home to take command of the 4th Division. The 4th Division remained in Texas City as reserve and, although at several times he seemed about to cross the Rio Grande, he was never a part of the Mexican expeditionary force.

After the Mexican situation quieted, Bell was relieved of the 4th Division, and placed in command of the Department of the West. He remained in command at San Francisco, where he had once been acting adjutant, until the United States entered World War I.

In the early spring of 1917, Bell was transferred to the Department of the East at Fort Jay, Governors Island, in New York City, and as commander of that department, assuming responsibility for Officers' Training Camps created by his predecessor, Leonard Wood, at Plattsburgh, Madison Barracks, and Fort Niagara. Bell's aide, Captain George C. Marshall, was most directly involved in the logistical support for these camps, battling a lethargic army supply system to properly equip the volunteer citizen soldiers. These camps, in August 1917, graduated the large quota of new officers needed for the new National Army and, to a large extent, to officer the new divisions of the east and northeast.

In the same month, Bell was offered and promptly accepted the command of the 77th Division of the National Army, to be organized at Camp Upton, New York.   The division was intended to primarily manned by draftees from New York state and featured the Statue of Liberty on its unit patch.  Bell commanded the division when the first newly appointed officers climbed the hill and reported to their first assignment, through that formative stage when barracks were thrown together at a miraculous speed, and being filled at the same rate. Then, in December, he sailed for France to make a tour of the front, and observe, first hand, actual fighting conditions. He did not return until the latter part of March 1918.

On his return, Bell failed the physical examination required for active service overseas. When the doctors decreed that he would not take the 77th Division to France, Bell was again given command of the Department of the East, and returned to his old headquarters, Governors Island, which command he held until his death in January 1919.

Awards and decorations
Medal of Honor
Distinguished Service Cross
Distinguished Service Medal
Indian Campaign Medal
Spanish Campaign Medal
Philippine Campaign Medal
Mexican Border Service Medal
World War I Victory Medal
Chevalier of the Legion of Honor (France)

Medal of Honor citation
Rank and organization: Colonel, 36th Infantry, U.S. Volunteers. Place and date: Near Porac, Luzon, Philippine Islands, September 9, 1899. Entered service at: Shelbyville, Ky. Born: January 9, 1856, Shelbyville, Ky. Date of issue: December 11, 1899.

Citation

Dates of rank
 United States Military Academy Cadet – class of 1878

See also

List of Philippine–American War Medal of Honor recipients

References

Further reading
 The Philippine "Lodge committee" hearings (A.K.A. Philippine Investigating Committee) and a great deal of documentation were published in three volumes (3000 pages) as S. Doc. 331, 57th Cong., 1st Session An abridged version of the oral testimony can be found in: American Imperialism and the Philippine Insurrection: Testimony Taken from Hearings on Affairs in the Philippine Islands before the Senate Committee on the Philippines-1902; edited by Henry F Graff; Publisher: Little, Brown; 1969. ASIN: B0006BYNI8
 See the extensive Anti-imperialist summary of the findings of the Lodge Committee/Philippine Investigating Committee on wikisource. Listing many of the atrocities and the military and government reaction.
 Ramsey, Robert D. III "A Masterpiece of Counterguerilla Warfare: BG J. Franklin Bell in the Philippines, 1901–1902", The Long War Series: Occasional Paper 25 Fort Leavenworth: Combat Studies Institute Press 2007 
 Raines, Edgar F., Jr. "Major General J. Franklin Bell, U.S.A.: The Education of a Soldier, 1856–1899," Register of the Kentucky Historical Society 83 (Autumn 1985): 315–46.

External links

  
Arlington National Cemetery

United States Army Medal of Honor recipients
American military personnel of the Spanish–American War
United States Army Chiefs of Staff
United States Army Cavalry Branch personnel
American military personnel of the Philippine–American War
United States Military Academy alumni
People from Shelbyville, Kentucky
United States Army generals of World War I
United States Army generals
Commandants of the United States Army Command and General Staff College
Philippine–American War recipients of the Medal of Honor
American lawyers admitted to the practice of law by reading law
1856 births
1919 deaths
Southern Illinois University faculty
Military personnel from Kentucky